Zanak is an Indian surname.

Zanak may also refer to:

Zanak, a pirate planet in The Pirate Planet of Doctor Who series
Zanak, the forward of Team White Snow, see List of Immortal Grand Prix characters

See also
Lappeh Zanak, a village in India